Colobothea forcipata is a species of beetle in the family Cerambycidae. It was described by Bates in 1865. It is known from Brazil and Ecuador.

References

forcipata
Beetles described in 1865
Beetles of South America